The following highways are numbered 11C:

United States
 New Hampshire Route 11C
 New York State Route 11C

See also
List of highways numbered 11
11C (disambiguation)